The Tour de l'Aude (English: Tour of the Aude), was a multi-day road bicycle race held annually from 1957 to 1986 in the department of Aude, France.

Winners

References

Cycle races in France
Recurring sporting events established in 1957
Recurring sporting events disestablished in 1986
1957 establishments in France
1986 disestablishments in France
Defunct cycling races in France